Woraksan National Park is located in the provinces of Chungcheongbuk-do and Gyeongsangbuk-do, South Korea. It was designated as the 17th national park in 1984. It is named after the  mountain Woraksan. The park is home to 1,200 plant species, 17 mammal species, 67 bird species, 1,092 insect species, 10 amphibian species, 14 reptile species, 27 freshwater fish species, and 118 spider species. 16 of the animal species are endangered.

References

External links
The park's page on Korea National Park Service's website

National parks of South Korea
Protected areas established in 1984
Parks in North Chungcheong Province
Parks in North Gyeongsang Province
1984 establishments in South Korea